Communis may refer to:

Anatomy
 Anulus tendineus communis or annulus of Zinn, a ring of fibrous tissue surrounding the optic nerve
 Carotis communis, the common carotid artery
 Extensor digitorum communis, a muscle of the posterior forearm present in humans

Other uses
 Canis lupus communis, the Russian wolf, a subspecies of the grey wolf occurring in north-central Russia
 Communis opinio, a Latin phrase referring to "common opinion," or "the generally accepted view"
 Doctor Communis, a term for Saint Thomas Aquinas (ca. 1225-1274), an Italian priest of the Roman Catholic Church
 Fratres Communis Vitae, a Roman Catholic religious community founded in the 14th century
 Res communis, the public domain
 Sensus communis, the part of the psyche responsible for binding the inputs of the individual sense organs

See also
 Commune (disambiguation)
 Vulgaris (disambiguation), another Latin adjective with the same meaning.

Latin words and phrases